Romance of Young Tigers was an instrumental band from Dayton, OH that released two albums through Magic Bullet Records and is noted for DIY handmade or recycled packaging for albums for limited or unique runs.

History
Founded in early 2005 in Dayton, Ohio by Seth Graham, Todd Osborn and Jeremiah Stikeleather. As a two guitar and bass trio Romance of Young Tigers was not able to find a drummer initially and optioned to forgo percussion in favor of loops to keep time. Stikeleather left to join Twelve Tribes after the release of the I Have Supped Full on Horrors EP and Gabe Mitchell and Aaron Smith joined for the recording of the Marie EP. The band disbanded in June 2009.

Members
 Todd Osborn
 Gabe Mitchell
 Seth Graham
 Aaron Smith

Former members
 Jeremiah Stikeleather

Discography
Studio albums
November, 2006 - I Have Supped Full On Horrors (CD) - (Self Released)
Limited to 100.

November, 2006 - I Have Supped Full On Horrors (CD) - un52006/48 (Unlabel)
Number 48 of series52

2007 - I Have Supped Full On Horrors (CD) - (Arclight Communications)
Limited to 400.

September, 2008 - I Have Supped Full on Horrors (CD/LP) - MBL107 (Magic Bullet Records)

EPs
September, 2008 - Marie (CD/LP) (Magic Bullet Records & self-Released, handmade)
Marie  was recorded live on October 26, 2007 and includes no overdubs.

See also
 List of rock instrumentals
 Post-Rock
 Ambient music

References

American experimental rock groups
Musical groups from Dayton, Ohio
Musical groups established in 2005
American progressive rock groups